Song Yang-ja (born 19 June 1944) is a South Korean sprinter. She competed in the women's 100 metres at the 1964 Summer Olympics.

References

1944 births
Living people
Athletes (track and field) at the 1964 Summer Olympics
South Korean female sprinters
Olympic athletes of South Korea
Place of birth missing (living people)
Olympic female sprinters